This is a list of public holidays in Saint Martin.

In addition, like other French Caribbean territories, private sector often take these holidays (jour chômé d'usage in France) which are not official holidays.

References

Public holidays in France
Public holidays in the Caribbean
Public holidays in Latin America